"Willy Use a Billy... Boy" is a song recorded by German eurodance project E-Rotic. It was released in October 1995 as the lead single from their second album The Power of Sex. The song is about safe sex, where Billy Boy is a brand of condoms from Germany that is also available in the UK. The single reached number eleven in Germany. It was also a hit in Austria and Finland where it reached number five. It also peaked at number 20 in Switzerland.

Music video
The music video for "Willy Use a Billy... Boy" was directed by Zoran Bihać.

Track listings
 CD maxi - Europe
 "Willy Use A Billy ... Boy" (Radio Edit) - 3:41
 "Willy Use A Billy ... Boy" (Extended Version) - 6:37
 "Willy Use A Billy ... Boy" (Safe The Sex Re-Max) - 5:37
 "Willy Use A Billy ... Boy" (Instrumental) - 3:40

 CD maxi - European Remixes
 "Willy Use A Billy ... Boy" (The House Remix) - 6:03
 "Willy Use A Billy ... Boy" (The Dance Remix) - 4:44
 "Willy Use A Billy ... Boy" (Willy's Latex Remix) - 5:07

Credits
 Written by David Brandes and John O'Flynn
 Composed by David Brandes and John O'Flynn
 Arranged by Domenico Livrano, Felix J. Gauder and David Brandes, at Bros Studios / Rüssmann Studios / Why Headroom
 Produced by David Brandes, Felix J. Gauder and John O'Flynn
 Published by Cosima Music

Charts

Certifications

References

1995 singles
1995 songs
Animated music videos
Blow Up singles
E-Rotic songs
Songs written by Bernd Meinunger
Songs written by David Brandes